"Don't Hurt Yourself" is a song recorded by the American artist Beyoncé for her sixth studio album, Lemonade. The song was produced by Jack White, Beyoncé, and Derek Dixie, and written by White, Beyoncé, and Diana Gordon. The song contains samples of "When the Levee Breaks" written by Jimmy Page, Robert Plant, John Paul Jones, and John Bonham, and performed by Led Zeppelin. Some critics compared the song to Beyoncé's "Ring the Alarm" (2006). The song received a nomination for the 59th Annual Grammy Awards in the category of Best Rock Performance. Billboard ranked "Don't Hurt Yourself" at number 61 on their "Billboards 100 Best Pop Songs of 2016" list.

Background
Jack White said of the song's origin in an NPR interview:
"You know, I just talked to her and she said, "I wanna be in a band with you." [Laughs.] I said, "Really? Well, I'd love to do something." I've always loved her voice — I mean, I think she has the kind of soul singing voice of the days of Betty Davis or Aretha Franklin. She took just sort of a sketch of a lyrical outline and turned into the most bodacious, vicious, incredible song. I don't even know what you'd classify it as — soul, rock and roll, whatever. "Don't Hurt Yourself" is incredibly intense; I'm so amazed at what she did with it."
The song's music video is part of a one-hour film with the same title as its parent album, which originally aired on HBO.

Critical reception 
Writing for Pitchfork, Jillian Mapes argues that Beyoncé is "giving the world a modern-day 'Respect' in 'Don't Hurt Yourself'". Mapes continues, writing "Even on an album stacked with some of Beyoncé's best recorded vocal performances to date, 'Don't Hurt Yourself' has her belting to a whole other dimension—specifically, that of Janis Joplin and late-'60s Tina Turner".

Tim Guillot, from Medium, says that "Don't Hurt Yourself" is "one of the best rock songs of recent years", continuing by stating that the track "is full-on rebellion, emotional and stylistic."

Chart performance 
After the release of Lemonade, "Don't Hurt Yourself" debuted on the Billboard Hot 100 chart at number 28 and the Hot R&B/Hip-Hop songs chart at number 16. As featured artist on the song, Jack White notched his first solo top 40 Hot 100 hit. In a prior appearance as a soloist, White reached number 81 in 2008 with the duet "Another Way to Die" with Alicia Keys, the theme from the James Bond film Quantum of Solace.

Live performances 
"Don't Hurt Yourself" is part of the set list for The Formation World Tour with the first performance taking place in Miami at Marlins Park on April 27, 2016. Beyoncé also performed this as part of her medley at the 2016 MTV VMA. Writing for The Guardian, Caroline Sullivan noted how during the performance of "the bitterest songs" off Lemonade, "Sorry" and "Don't Hurt Yourself", "she's a pillar of rage". Beyoncé also performed the song on her setlist for her 2018 Coachella performance, as well as co-headlining On the Run II Tour with Jay-Z. Jack White opened his October 10, 2020 performance on Saturday Night Live with a portion of "Don't Hurt Yourself" as part of a medley.

Charts

Certifications

References

2016 singles
2016 songs
Beyoncé songs
Song recordings produced by Beyoncé
Songs written by Beyoncé
Songs written by Jack White
Songs written by John Bonham
Songs written by John Paul Jones (musician)
Songs written by Jimmy Page
Songs written by Robert Plant
Songs written by Wynter Gordon